The 2022 Solihull Metropolitan Borough Council election took place on 5 May 2022 to elect members of Solihull Metropolitan Borough Council. This was on the same day as other local elections. 17 of the 51 seats were up for election.

Background
Since its creation in 1974, Solihull Metropolitan Borough Council has always the Conservatives as the largest party. Labour came the closest to overtaking them in 1996, when they won 16 seats to the Conservatives' 17. In the 2021 election, the Conservatives gained three seats on a vote share of 53.8% (+7.9), the Green Party gained 1 seat with 20.5% of the vote (-5.1), the Liberal Democrats lost 3 seats on 12.2% (-1.3), and Labour lost 1 seat on 12.9% (+0.9).

The seats up for election in 2022 were last elected in 2018. In that election, the Conservatives won 49.1% of votes and gained 2 seats from the Liberal Democrats, the Greens gained 1 seat from the Conservatives and won 25.1% of the votes, Labour gained 1 seat from UKIP and won 15.5%, and the Liberal Democrats lost 1 seat and achieved 11.9%.

Previous council composition 

Changes:
 September 2021: Angela Sandison suspended from the Conservatives
 October 2021: David Cole joins Conservatives from Labour, and Marcus Brain joins Greens from Labour
 November 2021: Cheryl Buxton-Sait (Green) resigns from council; seat left vacant until 2022 election
 February 2022: Andy Hodgson, Tim Hodgson, and Rosemary Sexton leave Greens

Results

Results by ward
An asterisk indicates an incumbent councillor.

Bickenhill

Blythe

Castle Bromwich

Chelmsley Wood

Dorridge and Hockley Heath

Elmdon

Kingshurst and Fordbridge

Knowle

Lyndon

Meriden

Olton

Compared to 2018 election results*

Shirley East

Shirley South

Andy Hodgson's changes are relative to when he stood in the 2018 Elections under the Green Party.

Shirley West

Silhill

Smith's Wood

St. Alphege

References

Solihull
Solihull Council elections